Djevara is a multicultural hardcore punk/alternative metal band, based in South London, that was founded in the University of Warwick.  The band's first incarnation was initiated by frontman and main protagonist Anté (then nicknamed "Bass"), in the form of the self-depreciatingly named 'Suck' - as all the musicians were novices (Bass himself only picking up the guitar just before joining university).  Eventually this band became 'Djevara', which Bass explains was taken from an (undisclosed) ancient language, of Eastern or Asian origin, which roughly translates as "a time or place denoting the beginning of justice and the end of intolerance".  Djevara were initially inspired mainly by the alternative rock phenomena of the early 1990s, though the sound later evolved from diverse, if basic, punk rock with hints of Nirvana, Green Day and The Offspring to a funkier sound that included influences from Rage Against the Machine, Faith No More and Red Hot Chili Peppers.  Whilst at university the band recorded many demos and became very popular locally, with success in both the local Battle Of The Bands and the National Student Music Awards.

On leaving university and after some line-up changes, Djevara quickly became disillusioned with the mainstream music industry and embraced the DIY ethic espoused by bands such as Fugazi with the example of their Dischord label, and started the Genin Records / Djevara Music DIY co-operative label, originally to release their debut album God Is White, which was recorded at New Rising Studio by Mark Daghorn, and eventually released in 2004.  The release, though small and independent, received generally positive reviews including KKKK in Kerrang! and 8/10 in Metal Hammer (then the most well-known publications in the UK for alternative metal and hard rock music), and the band received radio play on BBC Radio 1, despite the fact that the band were completely independent and had no pluggers or PR.

At the same time, Djevara became more pro-active, organising their own tours and getting involved more actively in campaigns and benefits, notably on human rights and third world issues.  Bass/Djevara organised the Kerrang!-inspired Scumfest festival in 2002, as well as a series of spin-off events.  Djevara also donated a percentage of revenue from merchandise and CDs to their chosen supported causes which included human rights organizations and various charities or campaigns.

Djevara's sound also changed as members matured musically and got into more genuinely alternative-progressive bands such as Refused, Tool (band), Kyuss, Botch and At the Drive-In as well as deeper into the UK underground scene, developing a heavier style and more left-field tastes.

Having conducted self-organised tours of both UK and Europe, Djevara returned to the Orange & Blue Studio in Catford, South London, where they had recorded their first demos, to record their second album.  The album Third World War : Cast The First Stone was released in 2007.  The period that followed was tumultuous, including several line-up changes over a short space of time and a temporary hiatus, until the current line-up solidified with the joining of former producer Malcolm Gayner in 2009.  In this period Djevara started running an arts-music centre out of a warehouse in North London called The Low Fidelity Disconnect, where they hosted numerous arts and music events.  Djevara relocated their "base" to South London in 2010 and have conducted numerous tours across Europe since then, usually twice a year in Spring and Autumn.  In 2011, the 'Djevara (Redux)' project was born, which is a semi-acoustic spin-off of Djevara, partially inspired by the 1990s "MTV Unplugged" concept, with a different set and varied line-ups (everything from Anté solo to accompanying fiddle, trejon, guitars, etc.).  The band's latest album "VIVA! / PUNK IS NOT A SOUND" was a dual-concept record and was released in late 2014.

Discography

Full-length albums
 "God Is White" 2004 (Genin Records / Djevara Music)
 "Third World War : Cast The First Stone"  2007 (Genin Records / Djevara Music)
 "The Rising Tide (Part 1) : Corsa Al Ribasso"  2010 (Genin Records / Djevara Music)
 "The Rising Tide (Part 2) : Hear No Evil"  2011 (Genin Records / Djevara Music)
 "Djevara (Redux) : Divided We Fall" [acoustic album] 2012 (Genin Records / Djevara Music)
 "VIVA! / PUNK IS NOT A SOUND"  2014 (Genin Records / Djevara Music)

Singles
 FIREBRAND SERIES: "The Death of Cliff Richard", "Autism" and "The Consumer" (2006) (Genin Records / Djevara Music)

External links
 - The official Djevara site
 - (official) Djevara Facebook

English punk rock groups